Provincial Highway 159 (or Route 159) is a two-lane north/south highway on the north shore of the Saint Lawrence River in Quebec, Canada. Its northern terminus is in Saint-Roch-de-Mékinac at the junction of Route 155, and the southern terminus is at the junction of Route 138 in Sainte-Anne-de-la-Pérade.

Municipalities along Route 159

 Sainte-Anne-de-la-Pérade
 Saint-Prosper-de-Champlain
 Saint-Stanislas
 Saint-Séverin
 Saint-Tite
 Saint-Roch-de-Mékinac

Major intersections

See also
 List of Quebec provincial highways

References

External links 
 Interactive Provincial Route Map (Transports Québec) 
Route 159 on Google Maps

159